Simon Roberts is a British actor. His television appearances have included the role of Alfred in the Agatha Christie's Poirot television film,  Hercule Poirot's Christmas.

Selected film and television roles 
Dustbin Baby - Mr Stevenson
Fat Slags (2004) - Horner Prize presenter
Absolute Power, Pope Idol (2003) - Vicar
Swiss Toni, Left Hand Drive (2003) 
Doctors, Cats (2002) - Harry Nicholas
Ted & Ralph (1998) - Cousin Jack
Agatha Christie's Poirot - Hercule Poirot's Christmas (1995) - Alfred Lee

External links and references

British male television actors
Living people
Year of birth missing (living people)